Wantulignathus is genus of biarmosuchian therapsid from the Madumabisa Mudstone Formation, Zambia. It is known from fragmentary lower jaws and ribs.

References

Biarmosuchians
Prehistoric therapsid genera
Guadalupian synapsids of Africa
Lopingian synapsids of Africa
Fossil taxa described in 2016